Washington Heights is a Roanoke, Virginia neighborhood located in northwest Roanoke, bound to the west by Virginia State Route 117.  It borders the neighborhoods of Peachtree/Norwood on the west, South Washington Heights on the south, Villa Heights on the east and Westview Terrace on the north. The neighborhood sees both a mix of residential development throughout its area spanning a more traditional grid street network in addition to more typical suburban ranch style construction.

References

External links
 Peters Creek North Neighborhood Plan

Neighborhoods in Roanoke, Virginia